Yuvan Yuvathi is a 2011 Indian Tamil-language romance film, written and directed by G. N. R. Kumaravelan that stars Bharath and Rima Kallingal. The film released on 26 August 2011. It received generally mixed reviews and became an average success at a box office. The film was dubbed in Telugu as Dear and in Hindi as Dildaar Ashique.

Plot
Kathirvel Murugan is a software engineer in Chennai. He shares his room with friend Sakkarai. Kathir hails from Usilampatti but wants to project him as city-bred and his ambition is to settle in USA. Kathir's father Sevaka Pandian opposes his son's attitude. An influential local chieftain, he is against inter-caste marriage and love. Kathir meets Nisha, who too wants to go abroad. Nisha loses her passport, and Kathir helps her find it. Slowly, he falls for her. Meanwhile, Sevaka Pandian arranges for his son's wedding with a High Court judge's daughter Thangameena. In the meantime, Kathir and Nisha get their visa and get ready to leave together for the USA.

Kathir thinks that he has escaped from his marriage, and when he wants to propose to Nisha, he gets a rude shock. She informs him that she is going to USA for her marriage. In the meantime, Sevaka Pandian learns of their relationship and kidnaps her. Afterwards Kathir also learns about it and saves Nisha, but her marriage is stopped. After ten months, they both meet in the same country again. Kathir doesn't want to see her, but his mind changes, and he tries to make Nisha love him. At last, they both fall in love with each other. Now they return to their hometown for their marriage. Initially, Sevaka Pandian doesn't allow. Later Kathir convinces them and they both marry each other making it a very happy ending.

Cast

 Bharath as Kathirvel Murugan
 Rima Kallingal as Nisha
 Santhanam as Sakkarai
 Sampath Raj as Sevaka Pandian
 Anuja Iyer as Thangameena
 Sathyan as Chacha
 Devadarshini as Anu
 Five Star Krishna as Krishna
 Shobana as Sakkarai's wife
 Swaminathan as Sakkarai's father
 T. P. Gajendran as Thangameena's father
 Mayilsamy as auto driver
 Madan Bob as Alexpandian
 Sujatha Sivakumar as Sevakapandian's wife
 Hemalatha as Deivanai
 Muthukaalai as Maari
 Shakthi Vasudevan as Saravanan (guest appearance)

Critical reception
Rohit Ramachandran of nowrunning.com gave it 3.5/5 stars stating that "Yuvan Yuvathi feels like being stuffed with stale food. You're likely to relish it". Malathi Rangarajan from thehindu.com stated, "A predictable and enjoyable finish to a love story that sparkles with the energy of youth!".

Soundtrack 

The soundtrack, composed by Vijay Antony, released on 1 July 2011. The album features 7 tracks with lyrics by Annamalai, Kalai Kumar and Priyan.

References

External links
 

2011 romance films
Indian romance films
Films shot in Chennai
2011 films
2010s Tamil-language films
Films scored by Vijay Antony
Reliance Entertainment films